"Walking Home Alone"  may refer to:

"Walkin' Home Alone", by Stan Ridgway from The Big Heat (album) 1986
"Walking Home Alone", song by The Nadas from  New Start (The Nadas album) and Show to Go
"Walking Home Alone Again", 1978 single by The Radiators from Space from Ghostown (The Radiators album)